Monsieur Brotonneau is a 1939 French comedy drama film directed by Alexander Esway and starring Raimu, Josette Day and Marguerite Pierry.

Synopsis
Monsieur Brotonneau leaves his cheating wife Thérèse for his secretary Louise. When his apparently repentant wife returns he reconciles her while continuing to love his mistress.

Cast
 Raimu as M. Brotonneau  
 Josette Day as Louise 
 Marguerite Pierry as Thérèse Brotonneau  
 Saturnin Fabre as M. de Berville  
 Robert Vattier as William Herrer  
 Léon Belières as Lardier, l'employé 
 Robert Bassac as Friedel  
 Pierre Feuillère as Jacques Herrer  
 Claire Gérard as Céleste, la bonne  
 Jean Témerson as L'huissier

References

Bibliography 
 Crisp, Colin. Genre, Myth and Convention in the French Cinema, 1929-1939. Indiana University Press, 2002.

External links 
 

1939 films
French comedy-drama films
1939 comedy-drama films
1930s French-language films
Films directed by Alexander Esway
French films based on plays
French black-and-white films
1930s French films